The Sivert Aarflot Museum is a division of the Sunnmøre Museum Foundation in Norway. The museum is named after Sivert Aarflot (1759–1817), who among other things started the first rural printing shop in Norway. The Sivert Aarflot Museum has a permanent exhibition in the museum building at the farm in Ekset in the municipality of Volda, where Sivert Aarflot lived. Among other items, the collection includes printing equipment.

References

External links
 Museum homepage

Museums in Møre og Romsdal
Cultural heritage of Norway
Volda